Neuklostersee is a lake in the Nordwestmecklenburg district in Mecklenburg-Vorpommern, Germany.

External links 
 

Lakes of Mecklenburg-Western Pomerania